Sage Weil (born March 17, 1978) is the founder and chief architect of Ceph, a distributed storage platform. He also was the creator of WebRing, a co-founder of Los Angeles-based hosting company DreamHost, and the founder and CTO of Inktank. Weil now works for Red Hat as the chief architect of the Ceph project.

Weil earned a Bachelor of Science in computer science from Harvey Mudd College in 2000 and completed his PhD in 2007 at the University of California, Santa Cruz working with Prof. Scott Brandt on consistency protocols, data distribution (CRUSH), and the metadata manager in the Ceph distributed file system. In 2014, he won an O'Reilly Open Source Award.

WebRing 

In May 1994, Weil developed a script based on work by Denis Howe and Giraldo Hierro that became the technology behind WebRing. Weil launched WebRing in June 1995 and eventually sold it to Starseed, Inc. in 1997.

DreamHost 

As an undergraduate, Weil worked with fellow Harvey Mudd College students Dallas Bethune, Josh Jones, and Michael Rodriguez to build DreamHost. The site was registered and began hosting customers’ sites in 1997. DreamHost incubated and eventually spun off Inktank.

Inktank 

In 2011, Weil co-founded Inktank with (CEO) Bryan Bogensberger as the CTO and technical architect. Inktank was a professional services and support company for the open source Ceph file system. The company was initially funded by DreamHost and later supplemented by Mark Shuttleworth. On 30 April 2014, it was announced that Red Hat would acquire Inktank Storage for $175 Million.

Publications

References

1978 births
Living people